Croizetoceros is an extinct genus of deer which lived throughout much of Europe, first appearing during the last stages of the Miocene and living until the Early Pleistocene.

Taxonomy
The type species, Croizetoceros ramosus was originally classified as Cervus ramosus, but was found distinct enough to be placed into its own genus.  Many subspecies of C. ramosus have been identified throughout Europe, and another species, C. proramosus, has also been described in 1996.

Description
Croizetoceros was a mid-sized species, similar in size to the living fallow deer. Croizetoceros was one of the first modern-looking deer. It had complex antlers, with four or even five short branches. They were long and lyre-shaped, with the tines branching off tangentially from the central branch.

Croizetoceros was probably a browser. Its teeth were characterized by a high degree of wear, indicating that it fed on abrasive plants.

References

Cervines
Prehistoric deer
Miocene even-toed ungulates
Pliocene even-toed ungulates
Pleistocene even-toed ungulates
Prehistoric even-toed ungulate genera
Miocene mammals of Europe
Pliocene mammals of Europe
Pleistocene mammals of Europe